was a Japanese author, intellectual and political philosopher who was active in early Shōwa period Japan. Drawing from an eclectic range of influences, Kita was a self-described socialist who has also been described as the "ideological father of Japanese fascism", although his writings touched equally upon pan-Asianism, Nichiren Buddhism, fundamental human rights and egalitarianism and he was involved with Chinese revolutionary circles. While his publications were invariably censored and he ceased writing after 1923, Kita was an inspiration for elements on the far-right of Japanese politics into the 1930s, particularly his advocacy for territorial expansion and a military coup. The government saw Kita's ideas as disruptive and dangerous; in 1936 he was arrested for allegedly joining the failed coup attempt of 26 February 1936 and executed in 1937.

Background
Kita was born on Sado Island, Niigata Prefecture, where his father was a sake merchant and the first mayor of the local town. Sado island, which used to be used for penal transportation, had a reputation for being rebellious, and Kita took some pride in this. He studied Chinese classics in his youth and became interested in socialism at the age of 14. In 1900 he began publishing articles in a local newspaper criticizing the Kokutai ("Structure of State") theory. This led to a police investigation which was later dropped. In 1904 he moved to Tokyo, where he audited lectures at Waseda University, but never earned a university degree. He met many influential figures in the early socialist movement in Japan but quickly became disillusioned; the  movement was, according to him, full of "opportunists".

Ideology
At age 23, Kita published his first book in 1906 after one year of research – a massive 1,000-page political treatise titled . In it, he criticized the government ideology of Kokutai and warned that socialism in Japan was in danger of degenerating into a watered down, simplified form of itself because socialists were too keen on compromising.

Theories of Japanese Politics

Kita first outlined his philosophy of nationalistic socialism in his book , published in 1906, where he criticized Marxism and class conflict-oriented socialism as outdated. He instead emphasized an exposition of the evolutionary theory in understanding the basic guidelines of societies and nations. In this book Kita explicitly promotes the platonic state of authoritarianism, emphasizing the close relationship between Confucianism and the "from above" concept of national socialism stating that Mencius is the Plato of the East and that Plato's concept of organizing a society is far preferable to Marx's.

Engagement with the Chinese Revolution

Kita's second book is titled An Informal History of the Chinese Revolution (支那革命外史 Shina Kakumei Gaishi) and is a critical analysis of the Chinese Revolution of 1911. 

Attracted to the cause of the Chinese Revolution of 1911, Kita became a member of the Tongmenghui (United League) led by Song Jiaoren. He traveled to China to assist in the overthrow of the Qing dynasty. 

However, Kita was also interested in the far-right. The right-wing, ultranationalist Kokuryūkai (Amur River Association/Black Dragon Society), 
founded in 1901. Kita—who held views on Russia and Korea remarkably similar to those espoused by the Kokuryukai—was sent by that organization as a special member, who would write for them from China and send reports on the ongoing situation at the time of the 1911 Xinhai revolution.

By the time Kita returned to Japan in January 1920, he had become very disillusioned with the Chinese Revolution, and the strategies offered by it for the changes he envisioned. He joined Ōkawa Shūmei and others to form the Yuzonsha (Society of Those Who Yet Remain), an ultranationalist and Pan-Asianist organization, and devoted his time to writing and political activism. He gradually became a leading theorist and philosopher of the right-wing movement in pre-World War II Japan.

Toward the Reorganization of Japan

First written in Shanghai but banned in 1919, the book was published by Kaizōsha, which was the publisher of the magazine Kaizō, in 1923, which was censored by the Government. The common theme to his first and last political works is the notion of a national policy (Kokutai), through which Japan would overcome a coming national crisis of economics or international relations, lead a united and free Asia  and unify culture of the world through Japanized and universalized Asian thoughts in order to be prepared for the appearance of the sole superpower which would be inevitable for the future world peace. It thus contained aspects associated with the doctrine of pan-Asianism. 

According to his political program, a coup d'état would be necessary as to impose a more-or-less state of emergency regime based on a direct rule by a powerful leader. Due to the respect that the Emperor enjoyed in the Japanese society, Kita identified the sovereign as the ideal person to suspend the Constitution, organize a council created by the Emperor and radically reorganize the Cabinet and the Diet, whose members would be elected by the people, to be free of any "malign influence", which would make the true meaning of the Meiji Restoration clear. The new "National Reorganization Diet" would amend the Constitution according to the draft proposed by the Emperor, impose limits on individual wealth, private property, and assets of companies, and establish national entities directly and unitedly operated by the Government like the Japanese Government Railways. Land reform would be enacted; all urban land would be changed to municipal property. The new state would abolish the kazoku peerage system, the House of Peers and all but fundamental taxes, guaranteeing male suffrage, freedom, the right to property, the right to education, labor rights and human rights. While maintaining the Emperor as the representative of the people, privileged elites would be displaced and the military further empowered so as to strengthen Japan and enable it to liberate Asia from Western imperialism. 

Kita asserted Japan's right as an "international Proletariat" to conquer Siberia of Far East and Australia, whose peoples would be granted the same rights as Japanese would, because social issues in Japan would never be solved if problems of international distribution were not decided. This was termed the Shōwa Restoration.

In its historical prospect Kita's political program was for creating a state socialism in a fascistic oriented "socialism from above", as a tool to unite and strengthen Japanese society. Japan's overseas actions were meant to focus on achieving the independence of India and the maintenance of the Republic of China to stop the partition of China like Africa, in the name of Asian unity. Another goal of his program was to build the great Empire which included Korea, Taiwan, Sakhalin, Manchuria, the Russian Far East and Australia.

On foreign policy 
He wrote a “petition” on foreign policy after the Mukden Incident. He strongly opposed a war against America, which was a popular opinion at that time, because the British Empire would join the war and the Japanese navy would not defeat them. He also thought China and the Soviet Union would join the war on the side of America. His proposal was that Japan should form an alliance with France and combat the Soviet Union. He thought that an alliance with France would contain the British Empire, and that Japan and France shared Anti-Russian sentiment because the Russian Empire had not paid massive debt to France.

Critical Reception
Walter Skya notes that in On the Kokutai and Pure Socialism, Kita rejected the Shintoist view of far-right nationalists such as Hozumi Yatsuka that Japan was an ethnically homogeneous "family state" descended through the Imperial line from the goddess Amaterasu Omikami, emphasizing the presence of non-Japanese in Japan since ancient times. He argued that along with the incorporation of Chinese, Koreans, and Russians as Japanese citizens during the Meiji period, any person should be able to naturalize as a citizen of the empire irrespective of race, with the same rights and obligations as ethnic Japanese. According to Kita, the Japanese empire couldn't otherwise expand into areas populated by non-Japanese people without having to "exempt them from their obligations or ... expel them from the empire." One of his religious inspirations was the Japanized Lotus Sutra.

His younger brother Reikichi Kita, political philosopher who studied for five years in the US and Europe and was a member of the House of Representatives, later wrote that Kita had been familiar with Kiichiro Hiranuma, then Chief of the Supreme Court of Justice, and in his paper in 1922 he had fiercely condemned Adolph Joffe, then Soviet Russian diplomat to Japan.

This eclectic blend of racism, socialism and spiritual principles is one of the reasons why Kita's ideas have been difficult to understand in the specific historical circumstances of Japan between the two world wars. Some have argued that this is also one of the reasons why it is hard for the historians to agree on Kita’s political stance, though Nik Howard takes the view that Kita's ideas were actually highly consistent ideologically throughout his career, with relatively small shifts in response to the changing reality he faced at any given time.

Esperanto proposal 
In 1919 Kita advocated that the Empire of Japan should adopt  Esperanto. He foresaw that 100 years after its adoption the language would be the only tongue spoken in Japan proper and the vast territory conquered by it according to the natural selection theory, making Japanese the Sanskrit or Latin equivalent of the Empire. He thought that the writing system of Japanese is too complicated to impose on other peoples, that romanization would not work and that English, which was taught in the Japanese education system at that time, was not mastered by Japanese at all. He also asserted that English is poison to Japanese minds as opium destroyed Chinese people, that the only reason it did not destroy Japanese yet was that German had more influence than English and that English should be excluded from the country. Kita was inspired by several Chinese anarchists he befriended who had called for the substitution of Chinese for Esperanto at the beginning of the twentieth century.

Arrest and execution 

Kita's Outline Plan, his last book, exerted a major influence on a part of the Japanese military—especially in the Imperial Japanese Army factions who participated in the failed coup of 1936. After the coup attempt, Kita was arrested by the Kempeitai for complicity, tried by a closed military court, and executed.

In fiction
Ikki Kita is a major character in the historical fantasy novel Teito Monogatari by Hiroshi Aramata.  In the novel, he is also a Buddhist shaman who is deeply devoted to the Kegon Sutras.
Kita appears in manga artist Motoka Murakami's Shōwa-era epic Ron.
Kita is a secondary character in Osamu Tezuka's Ikki Mandara.
Kita (portrayed by Hiroshi Midorigawa) figures in the plot of Seijun Suzuki's 1966 film Fighting Elegy.
In Yukio Mishima’s novel Spring Snow, Kita’s writings figure in the reading of the most intellectual of the main characters, Honda.

As for Honda, he could never be quite at ease unless there were books within easy reach. Among those now at hand was a book he had been lent in secret by one of the student houseboys, a book proscribed by the government. titled Nationalism and Authentic Socialism, it had been written by a young man named Terujiro Kita, who at twenty-three was looked upon as the Japanese Otto Weininger. However, it was rather too colorful in its presentation of an extremist position, and this aroused caution in Honda’s calm and reasonable mind. It was not that he had any particular dislike of radical political thought. But never having been really angry himself, he tended to view violent anger in others as some terrible, infectious disease. To encounter it in their books was intellectually stimulating, but this kind of pleasure gave him a guilty conscience.

See also
 Kōtoku Shūsui
 Sadao Araki
 Seigō Nakano
 Socialist thought in Imperial Japan
 Japanese dissidence in 20th-century Imperial Japan
 Japanese nationalism
 Japanese intervention in Siberia
 Rice riots of 1918
 Third Position

Notes

References

 (in Japanese)

Further reading

External links
  —a movie about the life and death of Kita Ikki

1883 births
1937 deaths
Japanese writers
Japanese Esperantists
20th-century executions for treason
People from Sado, Niigata
20th-century executions by Japan
People executed for treason against Japan
Far-right politics in Japan
Third Position
Executed Japanese people
Japanese fascists
People executed by Japan by firearm
Civilians who were court-martialed
Pan-Asianists
20th-century Japanese philosophers
Meiji socialists
Japanese revolutionaries